Brendan Joyce (born 1 May 1960) is an Australian professional basketball coach. He has coached all levels of the game. He has been to 3 Olympic Games with both the Australian men's Boomers team 2004, 2008 and women's Opals team 2016 and 2 world championships for Boomers men 2006 in Japan and Opals women in 2014 (bronze medal). Joyce was also assistant coach of the Boomers at the Melbourne Commonwealth games Gold medal team. Brendan is a former professional basketball player and head coach of the National Basketball League (Australasia) the Wollongong Hawks and the Gold Coast Blaze. In October 2021, Joyce took up the Head Coach role at new T1 League franchise Kaohsiung Aquas in Kaohsiung City in Taiwan.

Born in Melbourne, Victoria, Brendan Joyce grew up playing both basketball and Australian rules football and received an invitation to train and play for the North Melbourne Kangaroos. Brendan Joyce decided to continue with basketball and played in the National Basketball League. Joyce played a total of 289 games in the NBL over 13 seasons, playing for the Nunawading Spectres and the Westside Melbourne Saints and finally for the Brisbane Bullets in 1991. Joyce captained both Nunawading and the Westside Melbourne Saints. Following his playing career, Brendan Joyce became one of the most successful coaches in the National Basketball League, coaching in more than 400 games.

NBL Playing career
Brendan Joyce began his senior National Basketball League playing career in 1979 with the Nunawading Spectres in the National Basketball League's inaugural year. He was a point guard with the Nunawading Spectres team that lost to Launceston Casino City in the 1981 NBL Grand Final. Joyce was renowned for his defensive play and ability to penetrate and create opportunities for his teammates and was an all time NBL league leader in assists for many years. His career highs were 32 points vs. Melbourne Tigers (1985), 19 assists vs. Sydney Kings 1985 and 8 three-point shots made vs. Hobart Devils (1990).

NBL Coaching career
Brendan Joyce began his professional National Basketball League (Australasia) coaching career in 1996 with the Wollongong Hawks and developed the Hawks program with young players such as Glen Saville, David Andersen and CJ Bruton, who all later in their career became Olympians. After a losing record in his first two seasons, coach Joyce then lead the Hawks from the bottom to become a consistent winning team. Brendan Joyce coached the Wollongong Hawks to their first NBL championship defeating the Townsville Crocodiles in 2001. After 23 years in the National Basketball League, the Wollongong Hawks also became the first New South Wales team to win the NBL Championship. This success was followed by another grand final berth in 2005 with a loss to the Sydney Kings. The Brendan Joyce tenure at the Hawks delivered him the NBL (Australia) Coach of the Year in 1999 and 2001 and as a NBL All Star Coach in 2005. In 2007–08 Brendan Joyce became the inaugural coach of the Gold Coast Blaze and kept on winning. Brendan Joyce lead the Gold Coast to the playoffs in their first year and the Blaze team became the first ever Gold Coast team to make the play-offs in any Australian national competition.
Brendan Joyce was named the 2008 Gold Coast Region Coach of the Year and was again a runner up for the NBL (Australia) Coach of the Year. In the 2008–09 season the team missed the playoffs due to an injury-ridden season.

Australian Basketball Coach
In 2001 Brendan Joyce was named as Assistant Coach to the Australian men's national team the Boomers and continued this role until 2009. Brendan Joyce worked at two Olympic Games, 2004 in Athens and 2008 in Beijing, as well as the 2006 FIBA World Championships in Japan and assisting in leading the Boomers to their Gold Medal win at the 2006 Commonwealth Games in his home town Melbourne. In May 2013 Joyce was hired to be the Australian women's national team coach through the 2016 Olympics. Australian Opals win Bronze medal at the 2014 World Championships in Turkey.

Taiwan
Joyce joined the Kaohsiung Aquas in the first season of T1 League. The Aquas played well throughout the year, setting a number of individual and team records. The Aqua secured the number one seed prior to the playoffs, and won the T1 League's inaugural championship in a three-game sweep of the Taichung Wagor Suns. On June 24, 2022, Joyce received the Coach of the Year award in 2021–22 T1 League season.

Awards

NBL awards
National Basketball League (Australasia) Most Assists Award Winner 1988
NBL (Australia) All-Star Game Player 1988 and 1989
NBL (Australia) Coach of the Year 1999 and 2001
NBL (Australia) All-Star Game Coach 2005
NBL (Australia) Coach of the Year Runner-up 2005 and 2008
National Basketball League (Australasia) Champions 2001
National Basketball League (Australasia) Championship Runner-up 2005

National recognition
Australian Boomers Squad member (1981/1982/1988)
Australian U23 Captain (1981)
Australian U20 team (1978–79)
Australian Men's Team Assistant Coach (2001–2009)
Oceania Series (2003, 2005, 2007)
Olympic Games Athens (2004)
World Championships Japan (2006)
Commonwealth Games Melbourne 2006 Gold Medalist
Olympic Games Beijing (2008)
Australian Women's Team Head Coach (2013–2016)
Oceania Women's Champions (2013, 2015)
Bronze Medal Women's World Championships Turkey 2014 5 wins & 1 Loss
5th Place Olympics Rio 2016 5 wins & 1 loss

References

External links
Brendan Joyce High Performance Leader
National Basketball League Season By Season
NBL Player Award Winners
Hawks Early Years Building a Championship
Brendan Joyce Player Video Hobart Devils V Westide Melbourne Saints 1990
NBL Champion & Coach of the Year 2001 Video
Gold Coast Coach of the Year 2008
{http://www.adelaidenow.com.au/sport/basketball/sizzling-aussie-opals-have-surprised-all-at-fiba-womens-world-championship-but-not-coach-brendan-joyce/story-fnii09gt-1227076898599}

1960 births
Living people
Australian men's basketball coaches
National Basketball League (Australia) coaches
Australian men's basketball players
Australian women's basketball coaches
Australian expatriate basketball people in Taiwan
Kaohsiung Aquas head coaches
Basketball players from Melbourne